Roman Volod'kov (born August 12, 1973, in Zaporizhzhia) is a retired diver from Ukraine, who represented his native country in three consecutive Summer Olympics, starting in 1996. He won a bronze medal in the synchronized 10m platform event at the 2001 World Aquatics Championships and a silver medal in the same event at the 2003 World Aquatics Championships.

References
 sports-reference

1973 births
Living people
Ukrainian male divers
Divers at the 1996 Summer Olympics
Divers at the 2000 Summer Olympics
Divers at the 2004 Summer Olympics
Olympic divers of Ukraine
Sportspeople from Zaporizhzhia
World Aquatics Championships medalists in diving
Universiade medalists in diving
Universiade bronze medalists for Ukraine
Medalists at the 2001 Summer Universiade